Walter Piano Company, Inc. (also known as Charles R. Walter Piano Company) is an American piano-manufacturing company in Elkhart, Indiana. Run by the Walter family, to which many of the workers belong, the company hand-crafts its pianos in an Elkhart factory.

In 1969, Charles Walter, formerly the head of Piano Design and Developmental Engineering at C.G. Conn, bought the Janssen piano name from Conn. He founded a company to make pianos under the Janssen name. In 1975, Walter started his own line of console and studio upright pianos. In 1991, the company ceased to produce pianos under the Janssen brand. In 1997, the company introduced a grand piano under its own brand.

Piano models 
As of 2020, the Charles R. Walter line of pianos consists of four models:

 Grand Piano
 W 190 (6' 4")
 W 170 (5' 9")
 Upright Console Piano
 Walter 1520 (43")
 Upright Studio Piano
 Walter 1500 (45")

References

External links 
 

Piano manufacturing companies of the United States
Manufacturing companies based in Indiana
Companies based in Elkhart County, Indiana
Manufacturing companies established in 1969
Elkhart, Indiana